A Brand New Me is a compilation album by American recording artist Aretha Franklin. It was released on November 10, 2017, by Rhino Records and Atlantic Records. The album features archival vocal recordings that Franklin recorded for Atlantic Records accompanied by new orchestral arrangements by the Royal Philharmonic Orchestra and newly recorded backing vocals, in addition to the original (archived) background vocal and instrumental accompaniments.  Producer Nick Patrick said of the album: "There is a reason that Aretha Franklin is called the 'Queen of Soul.' There is nothing more exciting than that incredible voice taking you on an emotional roller coaster ride through her amazing repertoire of songs. To have the opportunity to work with that voice on this project has been the greatest honor and to hear a symphony orchestra wrapped around those performances is breathtaking." Franklin died in August 2018, nine months after the album's release.

Track listing
All Tracks produced by Nick Patrick and Don Reedman, with background vocal production assisted by Greg Field.

Personnel
Credits adapted from Allmusic and the album’s Liner Notes

Aretha Franklin - lead vocals* (All tracks), piano* (1-5, 8-14)
Patti Austin – background vocals (All Tracks)
Nigel Barr – trombone
Barry Beckett - organ (played by)*
Kenneth Bichel - synthesizer*
Graeme Blevins – tenor saxophone
Margaret Branch – background vocals* (2, 4)
Willie Bridges - saxophone*
Brenda Bryant – background vocals* (2)
Andy Caine – background vocals
Timothy "Tim" Cansfield – guitar (All Tracks)
Ben Castle – alto saxophone
Charles Chalmers - tenor saxophone*
Gene Chrisman - drums*
Ann S. Clark - background vocals*
Peter Cobbin – recording engineer
Tommy Cogbill - guitar* (1, 3), bass guitar*
Richard Cottle – brass arrangement
Sammy Creason - drums* (2)
Danny Cummings – percussion (1, 4, 9, 14)
Jim Dickinson – additional keyboards* (2)
Cornell Dupree - bass guitar*
Joe Farrell - tenor saxophone*
Howard "Buzz" Feiten - guitar (2)
Lynn Fiddmont – background vocals (All Tracks)
Greg Field – background vocals, recording engineer
Erma Franklin - background vocals*
Charlie Freeman - guitar* (2)
Eric Gale - bass guitar*
Simon Gardiner – trumpet
Ellie Greenwich - background vocals*
Mirriam Grey – background vocals
Graham Harvey – piano
Donny Hathaway - piano*, organ*
Roger Hawkins - drums* (1, 3, 9-10, 13-14), saxophone*, background vocals*
Eddie Hinton - guitar*
Nigel Hitchcock – alto saxophone
Matt Holland – trumpet
David Hood - bass guitar*
Al Jackson Jr. - drums*
Wayne Jackson - trumpet*
Jerry Jemmott - bass guitar* (1, 3)
Jimmy Johnson - bass guitar*, acoustic guitar* (1, 9, 13-14)
Almeda Lattimore – background vocals* (2)
Ledisi - background vocals (All Tracks)
Adam Linsley – trumpet
Andrew Love - tenor saxophone*
Ray Lucas - drums*

Arif Mardin - brass arrangements*
Tommy McClure - bass guitar* (2)
Hugh McCracken - bass guitar*, electric guitar*
Clare McInerney – baritone saxophone
Pete Murray – organ, acoustic piano (1, 4, 6-14), electric piano
Floyd Newman - bass saxophone*
Dewey "Spooner" Oldham - organ* (1, 10, 14)
Nick Patrick – rhythm arrangements
Steve Pearce – bass (played by) (All Tracks)
Josh Phillips – project manager
Valerie Pinkston – background vocals (All Tracks)
Billy Preston - piano*, organ*
Bernard Purdie - drums*
Ryan Quigley – trumpet
Chuck Rainey - bass guitar*
Don Reedman – rhythm arrangements
Nigel Reeve – mastering
Royal Philharmonic Orchestra - orchestra (played by)
Ralph Salmins – drums (All Tracks)
Peter Schwier – recording engineer, audio mixing
Giancarlo Sciama – project manager
Neil Sidwell – trombone
Steve Sidwell – conductor, brass arrangements, string arrangements
Pat Smith - background vocals*
Robin Smith – conductor, orchestral arrangements, string arrangements
Joe South - guitar*
Paul Spong – trumpet
Ray Staff – mastering
Sweet Inspirations - background vocals* (1, 3, 5-6, 8, 10-13)
Jamie Talbot – tenor saxophone
Richard Tee - organ*
Cécile Tournesac – digital editing
Mike Utley – additional keyboards* (2)
Chris Walden – musical arrangements, brass arrangements, orchestral arrangements, string arrangements
Jerry Weaver - guitar*
Kirsty Whalley – digital editing
Alistar White – trombone
Chris White – tenor saxophone
Martin Williams – baritone saxophone
Shena Winchester – background vocals
Andy Wood – trombone
Phil Woods – alto saxophone soloist*

Performances with an Asterisk (*) indicates sampled archive performances.

Charts

References

Aretha Franklin albums
2017 compilation albums
Atlantic Records albums
Albums recorded at RAK Studios
Royal Philharmonic Orchestra albums
Albums produced by Nick Patrick (record producer)